Facing may refer to:

Facing (machining), a turning operation often carried out on a lathe
Facing (retail), a common tool in the retail industry to create the look of a perfectly stocked store
Facing (sewing), fabric applied to a garment edge on the underside
Facing (TV series), an American docudrama series
Facing colour or facings, a tailoring technique for European military uniforms where the visible inside lining of a standard military jacket, coat or tunic is of a different colour to that of the garment itself

See also
Face (disambiguation)